Bonnie Lee Green Oscarson (born October 23, 1950) was the fourteenth president of the Young Women organization of the Church of Jesus Christ of Latter-day Saints (LDS Church) from 2013 to 2018.

Bonnie Lee Green was born in Salt Lake City, Utah to Theo James Green and Jean Stringham. Oscarson earned a bachelor’s degree, with an emphasis in British and American Literature, from Brigham Young University. For many years she lived in St. Louis, Missouri.

LDS Church service 
Oscarson lived in Sweden from 1976 to 1979, where she served with her husband while he was president of the church's Sweden Göteborg Mission, and again from 2009 to 2012 when she and her husband served as matron and president of the Stockholm Sweden Temple.  She is fluent in Swedish.  She has lived in New Jersey, Massachusetts, and Texas, where her husband was the first president of the Klein Texas Stake.

At the church's April 2013 general conference, Oscarson was sustained as the new general president of the Young Women organization, succeeding Elaine S. Dalton. Oscarson's appointment as general president of the Young Women was welcomed by church members in the St. Louis area. As president of the Young Women, Oscarson is an ex officio member of the church's Boards of Trustees/Education.

In 2015, Oscarson became the first female member of the LDS Church's Missionary Executive Council. These three committees “are immensely important in deciding how budgets are delegated, how programs and products are prioritized, and how church business moves forward,” explained Neylan McBaine in a Washington Post article.

Oscarson was released at the church's April 2018 general conference and was succeeded by Bonnie H. Cordon.

Personal life 
Oscarson married Paul K. Oscarson in 1969 in the Salt Lake Temple. They have seven children. Her husband was born and raised in St. Louis. Her husband's father, Roy W. Oscarson, was the first LDS Church stake president in St. Louis.

Notes

External links 
"General Auxiliaries: Sister Bonnie L. Oscarson", churchofjesuschrist.org

American leaders of the Church of Jesus Christ of Latter-day Saints
Brigham Young University alumni
General Presidents of the Young Women (organization)
Living people
American Mormon missionaries in Sweden
20th-century Mormon missionaries
Female Mormon missionaries
Temple presidents and matrons (LDS Church)
Mission presidents (LDS Church)
People from St. Louis
1950 births
Latter Day Saints from Missouri
Latter Day Saints from Texas
Latter Day Saints from Utah